Gray Rocks is a historic farm property on United States Route 2 in Richmond, Vermont.  Developed in the early 19th century, it was in agricultural use until 1978, and has a well-preserved set of farm buildings dating from c. 1813 to the early 20th century.  It was listed on the National Register of Historic Places in 1996.

Description and history
The property extends in part across the right-of-way of Interstate 89 to the northern bank of the Winooski River, and north into the hills above the river floodplain. Much of the area south of US 2 is open land, now in pasture or hay, and there are sections of open land north of the road, where most of the land is wooded. The cluster of farm buildings is set on both sides of US 2, with the farmhouse and garage on the north side, and barns and other outbuildings on the south side. The farmhouse is a two-story brick gable-roofed building, set facing west. It has a porch extending across its front, and is basically Federal in its architecture, although it has Italianate paired brackets in its eaves.

The property was developed as a farm about 1800 by James Butler, who sold it in 1813 to Asa Rhodes, with the house then standing.  It was farmed for over a century by members of the Rhodes family, and in the 20th century by the Andrewses, who ceased operations in 1978.  The farm's buildings represent changing trends in agriculture during that time, from general agriculture to specializations first in sheep and then dairy.

See also
National Register of Historic Places listings in Chittenden County, Vermont

References

Farms on the National Register of Historic Places in Vermont
National Register of Historic Places in Chittenden County, Vermont
Buildings and structures completed in 1813
Buildings and structures in Richmond, Vermont
Historic districts on the National Register of Historic Places in Vermont